In general topology, a remote point is a point  that belongs to the Stone–Čech compactification  of a Tychonoff space  but that does not belong to the topological closure within  of any nowhere dense subset of .

Let  be the real line with the standard topology. In 1962, Nathan Fine and Leonard Gillman proved that, assuming the continuum hypothesis:

Their proof works for any Tychonoff space that is separable and not pseudocompact.

Chae and Smith proved that the existence of remote points is independent, in terms of Zermelo–Fraenkel set theory, of the continuum hypothesis for a class of topological spaces that includes metric spaces. Several other mathematical theorems have been proved concerning remote points.

References

General topology